Kalia Union is a union of Sakhipur Upazila, Tangail District, Bangladesh.

Demographics
According to the 2011 Bangladesh census, Kalia Union had 13,137 households and a population of 53,134. The literacy rate (age 7 and over) was 37.9% (male: 40.4%, female: 35.7%).

See also
 Union Councils of Tangail District

References

Populated places in Tangail District
Unions of Sakhipur Upazila